Tropical Storm Grace was a weak tropical storm that struck Texas in the 2003 Atlantic hurricane season. The eleventh tropical depression and the seventh tropical storm of the season, Grace was also the weakest storm of the season. On August 30 the storm developed from a long-track tropical wave in the western Gulf of Mexico. Grace remained disorganized throughout its lifetime due to an upper-level low to its west. The weak storm moved northwestward and made landfall on southeastern Texas. Grace quickly weakened over land, and dissipated on September 2 as it merged into a cold front.

In Texas, the storm dropped heavy rainfall, causing minor flash flooding. The cold front, combined with the remnants of the storm, dropped moderate to heavy rainfall from Texas through the Mid-Atlantic. The worst of the flooding occurred in Indianapolis, where record rainfall affected over 700 homes. Despite the rainfall, damage was minimal along its path.

Meteorological history

A strong tropical wave accompanied with a low pressure system moved off the coast of Africa on August 19. It moved quickly westward and organized, developing banding features and cirrus outflow near the blossoming convection. The wave nearly developed into a tropical cyclone on August 21, though its fast forward motion dislocated the low level circulation from the deep convection. The wave entered an area of dry air in the central Atlantic Ocean, and by late on August 22 most of the convection dissipated from the system. On August 24, convection increased as the wave passed through the Lesser Antilles, though strong southwesterly upper level wind shear prevented further development. The tropical wave moved through the Caribbean Sea, and developed deep convection due to more favorable conditions over the Gulf of Honduras on August 28. The wave crossed the Yucatán Peninsula, and developed a surface low pressure area on the 29th in the Gulf of Mexico.

The depression moved to the northwest, and intensified into Tropical Storm Grace six hours after forming. Despite the increase in winds the center of circulation remained very broad, with Reconnaissance Aircraft having difficulty pinpointing the center. In addition, an upper-level low located over Brownsville, Texas produced shear over the western portion of the system, which limited outflow to the east side. Forecasters predicted the upper-level low to weaken, allowing for the possibility of Grace to intensify to a  tropical storm over warm waters. However, the upper-level low remained in place and continued to produce shear across the system. Grace quickly weakened to a tropical depression over land, and after turning northeastward into Oklahoma the depression was absorbed by a cold front.

Preparations
Three hours after forming, officials issued Tropical Storm Warnings from High Island to Corpus Christi, Texas. Local National Weather Service offices requested a voluntary evacuation for western Galveston Island including Jamaica Beach, the Bolivar Peninsula, and coastal areas of Brazoria and Matagorda counties, though few residents heeded the warnings.

Impact

Grace produced moderate amounts of rainfall along its path, peaking in southern Texas. The storm later merged with a cold front, which later dropped heavy rainfall in the Mid-West United States. In addition to its impact on the United States, the outer rainbands of Grace caused light rainfall in Yucatán and northern Tamaulipas.

South-Central United States
Locations closer to where the storm made landfall reported below tropical storm force winds, with the exception of Galveston which recorded a  wind gust. The outer bands of Grace spawned a waterspout just south of the western tip of Galveston Island, prompting the issuance of a tornado warning. The waterspout dissipated before moving onshore. The storm also caused light beach erosion, though little occurred beyond the erosion caused by Hurricane Claudette one month prior. Near the coast, high tides from the storm flooded piers, bulkheads, and low-lying areas. Further inland, heavy rainfall lead to flash flooding, covering roads and entering a few houses. Overall, damage was minor, and totaled to $113,000 (2003 USD, $147,100 2016 USD).

The rainfall was welcome in the state, and lessened the rainfall deficit.

Ohio Valley and Eastern United States
In Poplar Bluff, the rainfall caused severe flooding, resulting in rescues for people in trapped vehicles.

Residents prepared sand bags to prevent overflowing rivers and creeks, though rising waters entered streets and over 700 homes. The rapid rainfall in Indianapolis backed up the sewage system, sending hundreds of millions of gallons of sewage into the streets. Following the deluge in the state, the governor declared a state of emergency for the state. Eight local American Red Cross chapters arrived to provide meals and aid to the affected people.

The remnants of Grace dropped moderate to heavy rainfall eastward through the Mid-Atlantic States and New England. In Maryland, Hagerstown recorded , resulting in flash flooding. In Washington County, the system produced  of rain, a new daily record. Damage in Maryland, if any, was unknown.

See also

 Other storms of the same name
 Timeline of the 2003 Atlantic hurricane season
 List of Florida hurricanes (2000–present)
 List of North Carolina hurricanes (2000–present)

References

Grace
Grace (2003)
Grace (2003)
Grace (2003)
Grace (2003)
Grace (2003)
Grace (2003)
2003 natural disasters in the United States
Grace
Grace